Marco Beasley  (26 February 1957, Naples) is an Italian tenor, voice-actor and musicologist.

With composer and harpsichordist Guido Morini, Beasley was one of the three founding members of the Accordone early music ensemble in 1984; Stefano Rocco was later replaced by violinist Enrico Gatti. Beasley is a notable advocate in baroque performance practice for the revival of the recitar cantando of baroque Italy and the frottole of Naples, though his "folk" touches are not equally appreciated by all classical music critics.

Beasley sang the lead role of the Ancient Mariner in Luca Francesconi's opera Ballata at the Leipzig Opera in 2002.

Selected discography
 Stradella opera Moro per Amore. Velardi. Bongiovanni
 Musique Baroque a Naples, E. Barbella, F. Mancini, sonatas Gaetano Latilla: T'aggio voluto bene Giulio Cesare Rubino: cantata Lena, Giuseppe Porsile: Cantata sopra l'arcicalascione. Marco Beasley, with Bruno Ré, Paolo Capirci, Fabio Menditto, Federico Marincola, Andrea Damiani, as Ensemble Musica Ficta (Italy). Pierre Verany PV. 789023, 1989
 Canzoni Villanesche: Neapolitan Love Songs of the 16th Century Daedalus Ensemble 1994
 Past Time in Good Company – 10 year anniversary disc for Alpha Records: 1 track with L'Arpeggiata, directed Christina Pluhar 1998
 Meraviglia d'amore Private Musicke, Pierre Pitzl ORF
 Il Sogno d'Orfeo Accordone ORF 2002
 L'Amore Ostinato Accordone ORF 2002
 Vox Clamans in Solitudine Accordone 2002
 Il Salotto Napoletano – salon songs Accordone ORF
 Novellette E Madrigali Madrigalisti delle RSI and Ensemble Vanitas 2002
 La Bella Noeva Accordone Alpha 2003
 Stefano Landi: Homo fugit velut umbra – L'Arpeggiata Christina Pluhar Alpha Records 2003
 La Tarantella – Antidotum  L'Arpeggiata Christina Pluhar 2003
 All Improvviso L'Arpeggiata Christina Pluhar 2004
 Frottole. Accordone Cypres Records 2006
 Recitar cantando Accordone Cypres 2006
 Guido Morini: Una Odissea Netherlands Wind Ensemble 2007
 Il Settecento Napoletano Accordone 2007
 Alessandro Scarlatti: Il Martirio di Santa Cecilia dir. Diego Fasolis 2008
 Guido Morini: Si Dolce Netherlands Wind Ensemble 2009
 Vivifice Spiritus Vitae Vis Accordone 2009
 Fra Diavolo Accordone Arcana Records 2011
 Bellerofonte Castaldi Ferita d'amore. Lute solos, with 2 tracks with Beasley. Arcana 2011
 Storie di Napoli Accordone Alpha 2012
 Cantate Deo Accordone Alpha 2013 – Beasley sings both parts of tenor duets

External links 
Website of Marco Beasley

References

Italian tenors
1957 births
Living people
Musicians from Naples